The Combat is a 1926 American silent Western film directed by Lynn Reynolds and starring House Peters, Wanda Hawley and Walter McGrail.

Cast
 House Peters as Blaze Burke 
 Wanda Hawley as Alice Childers 
 Walter McGrail as Milton Symmons 
 C.E. Anderson as Red McLaughlin 
 Charles Hill Mailes as Jeremiah 'Jerry' Flint 
 Steve Clemente as Halfbreed 
 Howard Truesdale as Sheriff

References

External links
 

1926 films
1926 Western (genre) films
Universal Pictures films
Films directed by Lynn Reynolds
American black-and-white films
Films set in forests
Silent American Western (genre) films
1920s English-language films
1920s American films